Thakin Soe Myint was a Burmese politician and a leader of the National League for Democracy. Born in the Irrawaddy delta region in 1923, he first entered politics by joining the Dobama Asiayone branch at Myaungmya Township. He was a member of several political parties, including the People's Revolutionary Party, Myaungmya District Socialist Party, Anti-Fascist People's Freedom League, Socialist Party and People's Youth League. Most recently, he served as a member of the National League for Democracy's Central Executive Committee, joining in 1988, during the 8888 Uprising.

He died at his home in Yangon's South Okkalapa Township on 20 May 2010, of a heart attack. Soe Myint was cremated at Yangon's Yayway Cemetery on 22 May 2010.

References

National League for Democracy politicians
People from Ayeyarwady Region
1923 births
2010 deaths